Siphloplecton is a genus of cleftfooted minnow mayflies in the family Metretopodidae. There are about 15 described species in Siphloplecton.

Species
These 15 species belong to the genus Siphloplecton:

 Siphloplecton barabani Staniczek & Godunko, 2012
 Siphloplecton basale (Walker, 1853)
 Siphloplecton basalis (Walker, 1853)
 Siphloplecton brunneum Berner, 1978
 Siphloplecton costalense Spieth, 1938
 Siphloplecton demoulini Staniczek & Godunko, 2012
 Siphloplecton fuscum Berner, 1978
 Siphloplecton interlineatum (Walsh, 1863)
 Siphloplecton jaegeri Demoulin, 1968
 Siphloplecton simile Berner, 1978
 Siphloplecton speciosum Traver, 1932
 † Siphloplecton gattolliati Staniczek & Godunko, 2016
 † Siphloplecton hageni Staniczek & Godunko, 2012
 † Siphloplecton picteti Staniczek & Godunko, 2012
 † Siphloplecton sartorii Staniczek & Godunko, 2016

References

Further reading

 
 

Mayflies
Articles created by Qbugbot